is an action role-playing game developed by Imageepoch for the PlayStation Portable. It is based on the Black Rock Shooter franchise created by Huke. The game was released in Japan on August 25, 2011. NIS America published the game digitally on the PlayStation Store in North America (United States only) and Europe on April 23 and April 24, 2013, respectively.

Gameplay
Black Rock Shooter: The Game is an action RPG in which players take on the role of the eponymous Black Rock Shooter (BRS for short). The game is divided up into several missions in which the player must clear objectives to progress.

On the main overworld, BRS can explore the available areas and look for certain items. Battle begins when the player comes into contact with an enemy on the overworld.

During battle, BRS can aim and shoot with her rock cannon at enemies, block against attacks and sidestep to avoid them completely. If the player fires the rock cannon or uses the sidestep too much in a short time, the system will overheat, leaving the player vulnerable to attack until it cools down.

Throughout the game, players can earn abilities that can be equipped to BRS and used in battle, each with their own cooldown periods. These include offensive attacks such as a powerful blast, a sniper rifle, or support abilities that can increase BRS' stats such as her attack or defense. Certain sections will also see BRS ride a motorcycle, in which she can attack enemies on either side of her or use weapons to fire in front of enemies.

Plot

In the year 2032, Earth suddenly comes under attack from a group of aliens, turning the planet into a warzone. Nineteen years later in 2051, the last twelve humans alive awaken Black Rock Shooter to help battle against the aliens. However, there is more to BRS' existence than being a mere weapon.

Development and release
Black Rock Shooter: The Game was first announced on August 15, 2010 and was released on August 25, 2011. It features animated cut scenes by Ufotable. The game's opening theme is "No Scared" by One Ok Rock.

A limited edition Premium Box of the game was released in Japan, bundled with a Figma figurine of the game's antagonist, White Rock Shooter. The game was published in North America and Europe by NIS America on April 23 and April 24, 2013 respectively via the PlayStation Store. The game will not be available in Canada, Mexico and other European countries for legal reasons.

A manga adaptation of the game illustrated by TNSK was serialized between September 2011 and September 2012 issues of Kadokawa Shoten's Comptiq. The first volume of The Game was published on February 10, 2012, with the second volume released on September 26, 2012.

Reception

Black Rock Shooter: The Game received mixed reviews. It aggregated a score of 66 out of 100 on Metacritic based on 19 reviews. Famitsu gave the game a score of 33/40.

References

External links
 Official website
 Official website 

2011 manga
Role-playing video games
Action role-playing video games
PlayStation Portable-only games
Alien invasions in video games
Science fiction video games
Post-apocalyptic video games
Image Epoch games
Video games featuring female protagonists
2011 video games
PlayStation Portable games
Video games about extraterrestrial life
Video games about cloning
Video games set in the future
Video games developed in Japan
Video games scored by Manabu Namiki
Video games related to anime and manga
Single-player video games

ja:ブラック★ロックシューター#ブラック★ロックシューター THE GAME